Badr Bashir (born 15 August 1997) is a footballer born in Saudi Arabia who plays for Sitra as a midfielder.

Career
Badr Bashir started his career at Al-Faisaly and is a product of the Al-Faisaly's youth team. On 9 February 2018, Badr Bashir signed a 5-year professional contract with Al-Faisaly. On 23 February 2019, he made his professional debut for Al-Faisaly against Al-Qadsiah in the Pro League, replacing Rogerio. On 25 July 2019, he left Al-Faisaly and joined Al-Qadsiah on loan for the 2019–20 season. On 23 September 2020, Bashir joined Hajer on loan.

References

External links
 

1997 births
Living people
Association football midfielders
Al-Faisaly FC players
Al-Qadsiah FC players
Hajer FC players
Sitra Club players
Saudi Professional League players
Saudi First Division League players
Bahraini Premier League players
Saudi Arabian footballers
Expatriate footballers in Bahrain